The Miminegash Formation is a geologic formation in Prince Edward Island. It preserves fossils dating back to the Carboniferous period.

See also

 List of fossiliferous stratigraphic units in Prince Edward Island

References
 

Carboniferous Prince Edward Island
Carboniferous southern paleotropical deposits